Retrotransposon-derived protein PEG10 is a protein that in humans is encoded by the PEG10 gene.

Function 

This gene includes two overlapping reading frames of the same transcript encoding distinct isoforms. The shorter isoform has a CCHC-type zinc finger motif containing a sequence characteristic of gag proteins of most retroviruses and some retrotransposons, and it functions in part by interacting with members of the TGF-beta receptor family. The longer isoform has the active-site DSG consensus sequence of the protease domain of pol proteins. The longer isoform is the result of -1 translational frameshifting that is also seen in some retroviruses. Expression of these two isoforms only comes from the paternal allele due to imprinting. Increased gene expression (as observed by an increase in mRNA levels) is associated with hepatocellular carcinomas.

PEG10 is a paternally expressed imprinted gene that is expressed in adult and embryonic tissues. Most notable expression occurs in the placenta. This gene is highly conserved across mammalian species and retains the heptanucleotide (GGGAAAC). This gene has been reported to play a role in cell proliferation, differentiation and apoptosis. Overexpression of this gene has been associated with several malignancies, such as hepatocellular carcinoma and B-cell lymphocytic leukemia. Knockout mice lacking this gene showed early embryonic lethality with placental defects, indicating the importance of this gene in embryonic development. In preeclampsia placental tissue, PEG10 has been shown to be downregulated and upregulated implicating it as a possible causal role in the occurrence of preeclampsia.

Interactions 

PEG10 has been shown to interact with SIAH2 and SIAH1.

References

Further reading